Count Your Blessings is a 1959 romantic comedy-drama film released by Metro-Goldwyn-Mayer. It was directed by Jean Negulesco, written and produced by Karl Tunberg, based on the 1951 novel The Blessing by Nancy Mitford. The music score was by Franz Waxman and the cinematography by George J. Folsey and Milton R. Krasner. The costume design was by Helen Rose.

The film stars Deborah Kerr, Rossano Brazzi and Maurice Chevalier.

The film was shot in London and Paris.

Plot

While visiting Grace Allingham in wartime London at the behest of Hugh "Hughie" Palgrave, his friend, Charles is charmed by her and abruptly proposes marriage. They marry, but before their honeymoon, Charles reports back for military duty.

He reportedly is shot and taken prisoner. Grace waits for his return while raising their young son, Sigismond "Sigi". Charles returns after nine years, but over time, Grace comes to learn that during his long absence he has been seeing other women. She turns for comfort to her old love, Hughie.

A divorce seems imminent, while eight year-old Sigi is torn between the two parents and their very different ways of life. Because of their commitment to him, Grace and Charles ultimately reconcile.

Cast
 Deborah Kerr as Grace Allingham
 Rossano Brazzi as Charles Edouard de Valhubert
 Maurice Chevalier as Duc de St. Cloud
 Martin Stephens as	Sigismond
 Tom Helmore as	Hugh Palgrave
 Ronald Squire as Sir Conrad Allingham
 Patricia Medina as Albertine
 Mona Washbourne as Nanny
 Steven Geray	as Guide
 Lumsden Hare as John
 Kim Parker as Secretary

Box office
According to MGM records the film earned $810,000 in the US and Canada and $900,000 elsewhere resulting in a loss of $1,688,000.

See also
 List of American films of 1959

References

External links
 
 
 

1959 films
1959 comedy-drama films
1950s romantic comedy-drama films
American romantic comedy-drama films
CinemaScope films
Films based on British novels
Films directed by Jean Negulesco
Films scored by Franz Waxman
Films set in London
Films set in Paris
Films set in the 1940s
Films set in the 1950s
Films set on the home front during World War II
Films shot in London
Films shot in Paris
Metro-Goldwyn-Mayer films
American World War II films
1950s English-language films
1950s American films